Zinabad (also Romanized as Zīnābād and Zein Abad; also known as Zinetābād) is a village in Kuhin Rural District, in the Central District of Kabudarahang County, Hamadan Province, Iran. At the 2006 census, its population was 739, in 147 families.

References 

Populated places in Kabudarahang County